Pisidium supinum is a species of minute freshwater clam, a pea clam, an aquatic bivalve mollusc in the family Sphaeriidae (the fingernail clams and pea clams.)

The shell of this species is 3 to 5 mm in size, and is roughly triangular in shape.

Distribution
Its native distribution is Palearctic.

 Czech Republic – in Bohemia, in Moravia, vulnerable (VU)
 Germany – endangered (gefährdet)
 Nordic countries: Denmark, Finland (endangered), Norway and Sweden (not recorded in Faroes, Iceland)

References

supinum
Palearctic molluscs
Bivalves described in 1851